Chocolate-covered fruits include blueberries, pomegranate, strawberries, oranges, dried apricots, and other candied fruits and citrus peels. Dark chocolate, milk chocolate and white chocolate are used for decoration. Nuts, coconut, chocolate chips, sprinkles, and other toppings are sometimes added. During the Christmas season chocolate covered fruits are sold at European markets.

Cordials include cherries or cherry fillings and also often include liqueur.

Strawberries are often dipped in chocolate, which is a common gift for Valentine's Day in the United States. Strawberries are also served with chocolate fountains for dipping, often on wooden skewers. Chocolate fondue with various fruits is eaten for dessert.

Examples

 Chocolate-covered cherry
 Chocolate-covered prune
 Chocolate-covered raisin

Brands
Various brands make fruit covered chocolate candies including:
Cella's – chocolate-covered cherries
Marich Confectionery – chocolate-covered dried fruits
Mon Chéri by Ferrero SpA – The Mon Chéri is a single-wrapped combination consisting of a "heart" of cherry (18%) floating in a liqueur (13%) and contained in a bittersweet chocolate housing (69%).

See also

 List of chocolate-covered foods

References

External links
 

Chocolate-covered foods
Valentine's Day